The Unihertz Jelly (also the enhanced model, Unihertz Jelly Pro) is an Android smartphone developed by Unihertz, which billed it as "the smallest 4G smartphone" upon is release in 2017. It was initially developed with a successful Kickstarter project which reached its $30,000 goal in just 57 minutes, and eventually raised over $1.25 million. The Unihertz Jelly Pro is still currently available for sale in over 60 countries, including major retailers.

Specifications
Unihertz Jelly and Jelly Pro are both marketed as a phone with the full features of Android 7.0 Nougat and support for a 4G network, but are much more lightweight and compact than other phones with this same functionality. They feature a 2.45-inch display and weigh in at 60 grams.

In 2020, its successor, Unihertz Jelly 2, was released which features a slightly larger display.

Software

Hardware

Reception

Unihertz was associated with a previous very small 3G smartphone, the Posh Micro X, which launched in 2015.

Reviews of Jelly and Jelly Pro, the "world's smallest 4G smartphone" have been mixed, 

but it drew international attention. 
 There have been accusations of poor battery performance, and network traffic possibly sending personal data to China. Responses claim the network traffic is to speed up apps, and the company has been updating the phone software to improve performance. However, others have disputed this claim. It has received mixed reviews, with some critics calling it "innovative", praising it for its capabilities at such a small size.

References 

Smart devices
Android (operating system) devices